Huásabas Municipality is a municipality in Sonora in north-western Mexico.

Neighboring municipalities are Villa Hidalgo, Granados, Bacadehuachi, Cumpas, and Moctezuma.

References

Municipalities of Sonora